Anopinella perblanda is a species of moth of the family Tortricidae. It is found in Ecuador.

External links
Systematic revision of Anopinella Powell (Lepidoptera: Tortricidae: Euliini) and phylogenetic analysis of the Apolychrosis group of genera

Anopinella
Moths described in 2003
Moths described in 2000
Taxa named by Józef Razowski
Moths of South America